The Baker, later Rhodes, later Baker Wilbraham Baronetcy, of Loventor in the County of Devon, is a title in the Baronetage of Great Britain. It was created on 19 September 1776 for George Baker, Physician to George III and President of the Royal College of Physicians. His son, Sir Frederick Francis Baker, 2nd Baronet, FRS was accidentally killed by the vane of a windmill. The fourth Baronet (the title having descended from father to son), assumed in 1878 by Royal licence the surname of Rhodes in lieu of his patronymic. He never married and was succeeded by his younger brother, the fifth Baronet. He married Katharine Frances, daughter and heiress of General Sir Richard Wilbraham, nephew of Edward Bootle-Wilbraham, 1st Baron Skelmersdale. In 1900 he assumed by Royal licence the additional surname of Wilbraham. His son, the sixth Baronet, served as First Church Estates Commissioner, as Chancellor of the Dioceses of York, Truro, Chelmsford and Durham and as Vicar-General of the Provinces of York and Canterbury. On his death the title passed to his son, the seventh Baronet. He was High Sheriff of Cheshire in 1963 and also a deputy lieutenant of the county. In 1980 the title passed to his son, Sir Richard Baker Wilbraham, the eighth Baronet, who was Deputy Lieutenant of Cheshire in 1992. Following his death in 2022, he was succeeded Sir Randle Baker Wilbraham, the current 9th Baronet.

The current family seat is Rode Hall, Cheshire.

Baker, later Rhodes, later Baker Wilbraham baronets, of Loventor (1776)
Sir George Baker, 1st Baronet, (c. 1723–1809), FRS, Physician to George III
Sir Frederick Francis Baker, 2nd Baronet (1772–1830), FRS
Sir George Baker, 3rd Baronet (1816–1882)
Sir Frederick Edward Rhodes, 4th Baronet (1843–1911)
Sir George Barrington Baker Wilbraham, 5th Baronet (1845–1912)
Sir Philip Wilbraham Baker Wilbraham, 6th Baronet KBE (1875–1957)
Sir Randle John Baker Wilbraham, 7th Baronet (1906–1980)
Sir Richard Baker Wilbraham, 8th Baronet (1934–2022)
Sir Randle Baker Wilbraham, 9th Baronet (born 1962)

The heir apparent is the current holder's son, Rafe George William Baker Wilbraham (born 1999)

References

Kidd, Charles, Williamson, David (editors). Debrett's Peerage and Baronetage (1990 edition). New York: St Martin's Press, 1990.

www.thepeerage.com

Baker Wilbraham
1776 establishments in Great Britain